C. O. Bigelow Apothecaries is an American pharmacy currently owned by Ian Ginsberg. C. O. Bigelow was founded, as The Village Apothecary Shop, by Dr. Galen Hunter in 1838 in New York's Greenwich Village and is the oldest surviving apothecary–pharmacy in the United States.

Limited Brands had an agreement to open and operate other stores bearing the Bigelow name, which were operated as upscale beauty and skin care stores to compete with other stores such as Sephora and Neiman Marcus. However, all of these stores were closed, leaving only the original shop. Certain products from the line are sold in Bath and Body Works stores throughout the United States.

Due to its longevity and popularity, C. O. Bigelow was honored with a Village Award from the Greenwich Village Society for Historic Preservation in 2002.

History 
Dr. Galen Hunter, a Vermont native, established The Village Apothecary Shop in 1838, although he did not operate the store himself. His employee, Clarence Otis Bigelow, purchased the business in 1880, eight years after Hunter's death, and renamed it C. O. Bigelow Apothecaries. He also moved the business two doors north, to a new home at 106–108 Sixth Avenue (today number 414, after the street's renumbering in 1929).

In 1939, William Ginsberg became the owner. Since then, it has been passed down through the Ginsberg family, and as of 2022 it is in the hands of Ian, grandson William.

Stores

There was formerly a chain of stores; however, the only store still operating is the original Sixth Avenue store in Greenwich Village. Its chandeliers, though now electrified, still have their gas fittings. During the extensive blackouts on the East Coast in 1965 and 1977, Bigelow's was the only pharmacy between Maine and the Carolinas with enough light to remain open for business.

All of the other stores have closed. The Easton Town Center store in Columbus, Ohio, closed its doors in February 2012. Several stores closed in 2009: Northshore Mall in Peabody, Massachusetts, closed June 28, 2009; Westfield Garden State Plaza in Paramus, New Jersey, closed September 4, 2009; and Plaza at King of Prussia in King of Prussia, Pennsylvania/Upper Merion Township, Pennsylvania, closed July 1, 2009. Other closed stores were located in Copley Place in Boston, Westfield Hawthorn Center in Vernon Hills, Illinois, and Water Tower Place in Chicago, which closed in 2010. The location at Woodfield Mall in Schaumburg, Illinois, closed on August 18, 2012.

A C. O. Bigelow store was to be built in Tysons Corner Center in Tysons Corner, Virginia, but the scheduled construction was canceled.

Advertising
Famous patrons of C. O. Bigelow (as featured in advertisements) include Thomas Edison, Eleanor Roosevelt, and Mark Twain. Twain lived around the corner, at 21 Fifth Avenue.

References

External links
BigelowChemists.com

Companies based in New York City